A unate function is a type of boolean function which has monotonic properties.
They have been studied extensively in switching theory.

A function  is said to be positive unate in 

Likewise, it is negative unate in  if

If for every  f is either positive or negative unate in the variable  then it is said to be unate (note that some  may be positive unate and some negative unate to satisfy the definition of unate function). A function is binate if it is not unate (i.e., is neither positive unate nor negative unate in at least one of its variables).

For example, the logical disjunction function or with boolean values used for true (1) and false (0) is positive unate. Conversely, Exclusive or is non-unate, because the transition from 0 to 1 on input x0 is both positive unate and negative unate, depending on the input value on x1.

Positive unateness can also be considered as passing the same slope (no change in the input) and negative unate is passing the opposite slope....
non unate is dependence on more than one input (of same or different slopes)

Syntax (logic)